The original Tiger 900, manufactured by Triumph Motorcycles Ltd was introduced in 1993 and remained in production with minor improvements until 1998.  Known to its fans as the 'Steamer', a nickname identifying it as a Hinckley Tiger, not a Meriden Tiger, and also distinguishing it as a carburettor, not fuel injected engine, this 885 cc dual sport motorcycle sold in comparatively small numbers in its native UK, but with some relative success in the USA and continental Europe, particularly Germany.

The 'steamer' has proved a durable and tough motorcycle as befits its Dakar Rally type image, but it does suffer from several minor design flaws that hamper routine maintenance and give rise to some recurrent mechanical problems. These disadvantages tend to imply that most long term owners are at least mechanically competent and moreover somewhat idiosyncratic in their determination to keep this type of machine running.

Other notable characteristics of the 'steamer' include the strong 885 cc three cylinder engine and the seat height, both of which conspire to give a dominant riding position with the ability to see over other traffic.

It was replaced in 1999 by a heavily revised model known as the T709 – using a fuel injected version of the 885 cc engine - which albeit a more road orientated bike, sold well. In 2001 the T709 model was replaced with the model T709EN, 955 cc engine and fuel injected, commonly known as the Triumph Tiger 955i.

Tiger models overview

See also
List of Triumph motorcycles
Triumph Tiger 955i

References

External links

Triumph Motorcycles Ltd motorcycles
Dual-sport motorcycles
Motorcycles introduced in 1993